Knoch and Knoche are variants of a Germanic family name. A particular incident of the name may refer to:

People with the surname Knoch
Adolph Ernst Knoch, founder of the Concordant Publishing Concern and lead translator of the Concordant Version of the Bible
August Wilhelm Knoch (1742–1818), a German naturalist
Ernest Oliver Knoch, son of Adolph Ernst Knoch and editor of Concordant Publishing Concern's Unsearchable Riches
Heinrich Philipp Maximilian Knoch (July 23, 1842 – January 2, 1927), German leather manufacturer
Hubertus "Bertus" Knoch, aka Barry Prima, an Indonesian actor and martial artist
Lucy Knoch (born 1932/1923), American actress
Viktor Knoch, Winter Olympic athlete from Hungary, Bronze medal winner at 2009 European Short Track Speed Skating Championships
Winfred George Knoch (May 24, 1895 – May 23, 1983), United States federal judge

von Knoch 
 Christian Ernst von Knoch - der Weichende, member of 17th century German literary group Die Fruchtbringende Gesellschaft, that is, Fruitbearing Society
 Hans Friedrich von Knoch - der Beste, 17th century member of Fruitbearing Society
 Hans Ludwig von Knoch - der Platte, 17th century member of Fruitbearing Society
 Kaspar Ernst von Knoch - der Ausbreitende, 17th century member of Fruitbearing Society
Maximilian von Knoch, an August 1918 recipient of Prussia's highest military citation, the Pour le Mérite

People with the surname Knoche
Grace F. Knoche (February 15, 1909 – February 18, 2006 ), leader of the Theosophical Society
H. Gerard Knoche, bishop of the Delaware-Maryland Synod of the Evangelical Lutheran Church in America, (ordained 1967, retired 2009)
Nacho Knoche, lead singer of the gothabilly band Nacho Knoche & The Hillbilly Zombies
Robin Knoche, German football player

Places
Knoch Knolls Park, in Naperville, Illinois
Knoch, the longest road within Roscommon State Forest Area, Michigan

Other
Knoch High School in the South Butler County School District in Saxonburg, Pennsylvania
Knoch Cemetery, in Morgan Township, Coles County, Illinois

German Wikipedia
 :de:Knoch
 :de:Knoche
 :de:von Knoch
 :de:von Knoche

References

Surnames